Pickton may refer to:
 Robert Pickton (born 1949), Canadian farmer and serial killer
 Steve Pickton, British electronic-techno musician, producer and sound engineer
 Pickton, Texas, an unincorporated community in Hopkins County, Texas

See also
 Picton (disambiguation)